Beisaren is the northernmost point of the island of Hopen in the Svalbard archipelago. It is named after hunter Berner Jørgensen, whose nickname was "Beisaren".

See also
Kapp Thor – southernmost point of Hopen.

References

Headlands of Svalbard
Hopen (Svalbard)